A list of Bangladeshi films released in 1990.

References

See also

 1990 in Bangladesh

Film
Lists of 1990 films by country or language
 1990